The Saleen XP6 is a performance sport utility vehicle based on the Ford Explorer created by Saleen during 1998. It is also the six-cylinder sibling to the Saleen XP8, which remains identical in appearance and upgrades to the XP6 except for an eight-cylinder engine, with or without supercharger. The Saleen XP6 comes in two- or four-wheel-drive four-door configurations, packing only a SOHC 4.0-liter V-6 engine configuration. No supercharger was available at the time of production.

Production Quantities 
The Saleen XP6 remains an even more elusive vehicle than its sibling, the Saleen XP8, because it was entirely a "mistake." Saleen had ordered a batch of Explorers in 1998 for transformation into a XP8, however, some six cylinder Explorer XLT's were thrown into the batch. Rather than send the Explorers back for an exchange, which would result in lost time and money for Saleen, they decided to outfit the six cylinder Explorer XLT's instead with the XP8 package. Thus, the XP6 was born. 

As a result of this "mistake", the production numbers for the XP6 are extremely low. It is estimated that a maximum of ten are in existence. Six have been confirmed through the ExplorerX Saleen XP6/XP8 Owner Registry Database.

Specifications 
Saleen lowers the Explorer about 2 inches, for both improved handling and appearance. Springs and shocks are swapped for the company's Racecraft components, and rolling stock is upgraded to Saleen's own 18-inch genuine magnesium wheels wrapped by Pirelli 255/55SR18 Scorpion S/T radials.

The exterior appearance package includes special front and rear fascia, side skirts, door cladding, roof-mounted rear wing, and carbon fiber trim. The cabin is treated to either a real wood or carbon fiber appearance package, depending upon color choice, as well as Saleen gauge faces and floor mats. A particularly nice, though pricey, option is Saleen/RECARO leather seating ($3950), offering 10-way power adjustment up front and hip-hugging support.

Engine
Bore & Stroke: 3.95in x 3.32in
Displacement: 4.0L / 245cid
Compression Ratio: 9.7:1
Horsepower: 205hp / 5,000 RPM
Torque: 250lb/ft / 3,000 RPM

Drive Train
Transmission: 5 Speed automatic

Brakes
ABS: Three channel, four sensor system
Disc Brakes: Front & Rear
Front: 13in vented disc four piston caliper (optional)
These front disc brakes were eventually recalled and replaced with stock Explorer calipers, again due to lack of structural integrity.

Additional Options
 Carbon Fiber hood
 Premium Sound System
 Integrated LCD Display
 Saleen Recaro Leather interior

Variation in models 
Like the XP8, each Saleen XP6 may vary dramatically in appearance and options, as a result of Saleen farming the production of the XP6's to California bodyshops and Ford dealers. Many of the options available in Saleen XP6's, such as the carbon fiber composite hood and carbon fiber accents were installed outside of the Saleen Inc. compound.

Therefore, many XP6's vary significantly with options installed.

There is no XP6 with a supercharger option, as there was no supercharger kit available to V6 Explorers at the time.

Availability 
Saleen XP6's are now well past their final production date (1998), and as such, can only be purchased through online advertisements and car auction websites such as eBay Motors. Prices vary significantly due to condition, mileage, and most importantly, options installed. Sale prices can vary between $8,000 to $15,000 depending on the above.

Additionally, all performance and appearance parts for the XP6's have ceased production back in 2001.  Parts are virtually impossible to find and purchase, and reproduction costs are sky high due to low demand and basically, the owner of the vehicle themselves footing the bill. Saleen XP6 parts are no longer available through Saleen whatsoever, even to owners.  Saleen does, however offer repair services for the XP6 and its parts in the event that accident repair should prove necessary.

This has led to what some owners describe as the "glass-slipper effect", as that if any substantial damage were to occur, replacement parts are not an option. Therefore, because of this and the very low production numbers to begin with of the XP6, the XP6 maintains a distinct allure to Ford and Saleen enthusiasts unfounded in many other vehicles.

Records 
The Saleen Book, an official book produced by Saleen detailing the history and production numbers of Saleen vehicles past and present, noticeably neglected to cover and feature the XP6 and XP8.

As such, the Saleen Explorer XP6/XP8 Owner Registry Database was created on ExplorerX, an active Ford Explorer enthusiast website to maintain records. Although unofficial, it remains the only and most active list dedicated to Saleen XP6 and XP8 vehicles. An active XP6 and XP8 community resides there.

See also
Saleen
Saleen XP8

References

External links
The Ultimate Saleen XP8 Guide

Sport utility vehicles
XP6